The Bazna gas field is a natural gas field located in Bazna, Sibiu County. It was discovered in 1912 and developed by and Romgaz. It began production in 1915 and produces natural gas and condensates. The total proven reserves of the Bazna gas field are around 1.06 trillion cubic feet (30 km³), and production is slated to be around 23.8 million cubic feet/day (0.67×105m³) in 2010.

References

Natural gas fields in Romania